Saskatoon—Clark's Crossing was a federal electoral district in the province of Saskatchewan, Canada, that was represented in the House of Commons of Canada from 1988 to 1997. This riding was created in 1987 from parts of Saskatoon West riding.

The electoral district was abolished in 1996 when it was redistributed between Saskatoon—Rosetown and Wanuskewin ridings.

Electoral history

See also 

 List of Canadian federal electoral districts
 Past Canadian electoral districts

External links 
 

Former federal electoral districts of Saskatchewan